In military terms, 153rd Division or 153rd Infantry Division may refer to:

 153rd Division (Wehrmacht), formed in 1939 and fought in World War II
 153rd Infantry Division Macerata (Italian, World War II)
 153rd Division (Imperial Japanese Army)
 153rd Rifle Division (Soviet Union)